The Mizoram Legislative Assembly election, 2013 was held on 25 November 2013 in all 40 constituencies of the Legislative Assembly of Mizoram. Results were declared on 9 December. The main contest was between incumbent the Indian National Congress and the Mizo National Front led Mizoram Democratic Alliance. Incumbent Chief Minister Pu Lalthanhawla and his party Indian National Congress won a majority and continued in government.

Background
The election for 40 seats legislative assembly was held on 25 November 2013. There were 6.9 lakh eligible voters. Voter-verified paper audit trail (VVPAT) along with EVMs was used on a large-scale for the first time in India, in 10 assembly seats out of 40  in Mizoram elections. The seven armed battalion of state police and 31 companies of central para-military forces and other state police were deployed for peaceful election.

Candidates

There were total 142 candidates including 40 Congress and 40 Mizoram Democratic Alliance (MDA) candidates. MDA candidates include 31 Mizo National Front (MNF), 8 Mizoram People's Conference (MPC) and one Maraland Democratic Front (MDF) candidates. 38 Zoram Nationalist Party, 17 Bharatiya Janata Party, 2 Nationalist Congress Party and one Jai Maha Bharath Party candidate also contested. There were total six female candidates including 3 Bharatiya Janata Party candidates, one Congress, one MNF and one other female candidate. All the seats were reserved for Scheduled Tribe candidates, except Lunglei South.

Results
The result was declared on 9 December 2013. Indian National Congress won a large majority of 34 out of 40 seats. Mizo National Front and Mizoram People's Conference won five seats and one seat respectively. 81% of eligible voters turned out to vote.

|- style="background-color:#E9E9E9; text-align:center;"
! class="unsortable"|
! Political Party !! Flag !! Seats  Contested !! Won !! Net Change  in seats !! % of  Seats
! Votes !! Vote % !! Change in vote %
|- style="background: #90EE90;"
| 
| style="text-align:left;" |Indian National Congress
|
| 40 || 34 ||  2 || 85.0 || 2,55,917 || 45.83 || 
|-
| 
| style="text-align:left;" |Mizo National Front
|
| 31 || 5 ||  2 || 12.5 || 1,64,305 || 28.65 || 
|-
| 
| style="text-align:left;" |Mizoram People's Conference
|
| 8 || 1 ||  1 || 2.5 || 35,269 || 32.02 || 
|-
| 
| style="text-align:left;" |Bharatiya Janata Party
|
| 17 || 0 ||  ||  || 2,139 || 0.87 || 
|- class="unsortable" style="background-color:#E9E9E9"
! colspan = 3|
! style="text-align:center;" |Total !! 40 !! style="text-align:center;" |Voters !! 5,73,417 !! style="text-align:center;" |Turnout
! colspan = 2|81%
|}

|-
| colspan="7"| 
|- bgcolor="#E9E9E9" 
! style="text-align:left;" rowspan="2" colspan="2"| Parties and coalitions
! colspan="3"| Popular vote
! colspan="2"| Seats
|- bgcolor="#E9E9E9" 
! width="70"| Votes
! width="45"| %
! width="45"| ±pp
! width="30"| Won
! width="30"| +/−
|-style="text-align:right"
| width="1" bgcolor=""|
| align="left"| Indian National Congress (INC)
| 255,917 || 44.3 ||5.4
| 34 || 2
|-style="text-align:right"
| bgcolor=""|
| align="left"| Mizo National Front (MNF)
| 164,305 || 28.4 ||2.3
| 5 || 2
|-style="text-align:right"
| bgcolor="blue"|
| align="left"| Zoram Nationalist Party (ZNP)
| 99,916 || 17.3 ||7.3
| 0 || 2
|-style="text-align:right"
| bgcolor=""|
| align="left"| Mizoram People's Conference (MPC)
| 35,269 || 6.1 ||4.3
| 1 || 1
|-style="text-align:right"
|
| align="left" | Maraland Democratic Front (MDF)
| 5,433 || 0.9 ||0.1
| 0 || 1
|-style="text-align:right"
| bgcolor="" |
| align="left" | Nationalist Congress Party (NCP)
| 4,835 || 0.8 ||0.7
| 0 || 
|-style="text-align:right"
| width="1" bgcolor="" |
| align="left" | Bharatiya Janata Party (BJP)
| 2,139 || 0.37 ||0.07
| 0 || 
|-style="text-align:right"
| bgcolor="" |
| align="left" | Independents (IND)
| 1,764 || 0.3 ||7.4
| 0 || 
|-style="text-align:right"
|
| align="left"| Jai Maha Bharath Party (JMBP)
| 29 || 0.0 ||
| 0 || 
|-style="text-align:right"
| bgcolor="black"|
| align="left"| None of the Above (NOTA)
| 8,810 || 1.5 ||1.5
|  || 
|-
| colspan="7" bgcolor="#E9E9E9"|
|- style="text-align:right; font-weight:bold;"
| align="left" colspan="2"| Total
| 573,417 || 100.00 || bgcolor="#E9E9E9"|
| 40 || ±0
|-
|}

Elected Members

References

2013 State Assembly elections in India
State Assembly elections in Mizoram
2010s in Mizoram